Tony Hunt may refer to:

 Tony Hunt Sr. (1942–2017), Canadian First Nations artist
 Tony Hunt (Australian footballer) (born 1952), former Australian rules footballer
 Tony Hunt (American football) (born 1985), former professional American football running back
 Tony Hunt (judge), Irish High Court judge